Daniel Seth Gelber is a game designer who has worked primarily on wargames and role-playing games.

Career
Dan Gelber had created an RPG design about a computer-controlled world of dystopic adventure called "Alpha Complex" that he ran for his local group, and Gelber's friend Greg Costikyan and Eric Goldberg approached Gelber about turning the setting into a professional product. Gelber gave Goldberg and Costikyan his notes for the game and they turned those ideas into a complete manuscript. Gelber, Costikyan, and Goldberg licensed Paranoia to West End Games, and Ken Rolston helped rewrite the rules before it was published in 1984.

Gelber also designed (with Jeffrey Simons and Evan Jones) The Marvel Universe Roleplaying Game.

References

External links
 
 

Living people
Place of birth missing (living people)
Role-playing game designers
Year of birth missing (living people)